Arun Kumar   versus Inspector General of Registration   (2019) is a landmark decision of the Madurai Bench of the Madras High Court where the court recognised transwomen as bride under Hindu Marriage Act of 1955.

Background 
In accordance with Hindu traditions, Arun Kumar married Sreeja, a trans woman. Following the ceremony, the couple tried to register their marriage with the Joint Registrar of Tuticorin. The Registrar refused to register their marriage. The couple filed a suit against the Registrar for refusing to register their marriage under Hindu Marriage Act of 1955.

The Madurai Bench of the Madras High Court was asked to consider whether the term ‘bride’, as referenced in Section 5 of the Hindu Marriage Act of 1955 meant cisgender women exclusively, or included trans-women as well. The Court was requested to consider whether the refusal to register the marriage of a person based on sexual orientation or sex of the individual violates the right to equality before the law (Article 14), freedom of speech and expression (Article 19(1)(a)), protection of life and personal liberty (Article 21) and freedom of conscience and free profession, practice and propagation of religion (Article 25) guaranteed under the Constitution of India.

Judgement 
The Court held that word ‘bride’ in Section 5 of Hindu Marriage Act of 1955 applies to transgender people who perceive themselves as a woman. Therefore, the marriage ceremony held between a male and a transwoman, in accordance with Hindu customs and traditions, would be considered a Hindu Marriage. And, the refusal to register the marriage of Ms Sreeja would be an infringement of her fundamental rights guaranteed under Articles 14, 19(1)(a), 21 and 25 of the Constitution of India.

See also 

 LGBT Rights in India
 Supriyo v. Union Of India (2023)
 Chinmayee Jena v. State of Odisha (2020)
 National Legal Services Authority v. Union of India (2014)

References 

Marriage law in India
Transgender case law
Indian case law
Indian LGBT rights case law
2019 in LGBT history